Adam Pérelle (1640–1695) was a French artist and writer born in Paris in 1640 and died in the same city in 1695. He was the son of Gabriel Pérelle and the younger brother of Nicolas Pérelle.

Like his father from whom he learned his craft and his brother, he drew views of landscapes and monuments. He obtained the title of engraver of the King and taught drawing and painting in high society.

References

External links

Veües des plus beaux lieux de France et d'Italie : Digitized album containing 283 prints (Princeton University Digital Library)
Works by Perelle on Google Arts
Works by Perelle on Royal Academy of Arts
Works by Perelle on Harvard Art Museums

1640 births
1695 deaths
French draughtsmen
Artists from Paris